Renukamma Murugodu was an Indian actress who worked in Kannada film industry. She began acting at 13 and performed in many dramas, soaps and films including Kraurya, Nammura Mandara Hoove and Shabdavedhi.

Renukamma was a winner of the Gubbi Veeranna Award. She died at 76.

Filmography

Some of Renukamma's movies are listed here:
 2007-Arasu
 2007-Ninade Nenapu
 2004-Darshan
 2004-Ranga SSLC
 2004-Pravaha
 2003-Kushalave Kshemave
 2003-Chandra Chakori
 2003-Artha
 2002-Joot
 2002-Parva
 2001-Mussanje
 2000-Shabdavedhi
 1999-Chandramukhi Pranasakhi
 1999-Veerappa Nayka
 1998-Hoomale
 1997-Prema Raga Hadu Gelati
 1996-Kraurya[Actress(Rangajji)]
 1996-Nammoora Mandara Hoove(Kamalamma)

References

1932 births
2008 deaths
Child actresses in Kannada cinema
Actresses from Karnataka
20th-century Indian actresses
Indian film actresses